The 1882 Oregon gubernatorial election took place on June 5, 1882 to elect the governor of the U.S. state of Oregon. The election matched Republican Zenas Ferry Moody, Speaker of the Oregon House of Representatives, against Democrat Joseph Showalter Smith, former member of the United States House of Representatives.

Results

References

Gubernatorial
1882
Oregon
June 1882 events